Il Colle (or Colle) is a village in Tuscany, central Italy, administratively a frazione of the comune of Gaiole in Chianti, province of Siena. At the time of the 2001 census its population was 31.

Il Colle is about 23 km from Siena and 13 km from Gaiole in Chianti.

References 

Frazioni of Gaiole in Chianti